Terminus est is a Latin phrase that can be translated roughly as "it is the end" or "it is the limit". It may refer to:

Terminus Est, a sword in the science fiction series The Book of the New Sun by Gene Wolfe
Terminus Est, a sword in the video game Castlevania: Symphony of the Night
Terminus Est, a sword in the online game Path of Exile
Terminus Est, a character in the light novel series Seirei Tsukai no Blade Dance
Terminus Est, the flagship of Typhus, of the Death Guard, in the Warhammer 40,000 universe
"Terminus Est", a song on Julia Ecklar's album Divine Intervention